Little Trout Bay (petite baie trout in French) is a bay of Lake Superior located in Neebing Municipality in the Thunder Bay District of the Canadian province of Ontario. The bay is protected as a conservation area. Anglers visit all year round, including ice fishing in winter.

The area has picnic facilities and hiking trails with look-outs.

References 

Landforms of Thunder Bay District
Bays of Lake Superior
Bays of Ontario